Love or Lust may refer to:

Music
Love or Lust?, a 1991 album by American singer Adeva
Love or Lust (album), by Cash Cash

Songs
"Love Or Lust", a 1992 song by Debbie Gibson from the single "Shock Your Mama"
"Love or Lust" (Ken Hirai song), from Gaining Through Losing